Burns, New South Wales is a village in the Unincorporated Far West of New South Wales.

Location
Burns, New South Wales is on the New South Wales–South Australian border and functionally Burns is a suburb of Cockburn, South Australia located on the opposite side of the border.

The Barrier Highway, main Sydney to Adelaide railway line and the now defunct Silverton Tramway, all pass through the Burns.
The topography is flat and sparsely vegetated.  The district has a Köppen climate classification of BWh desert.

History
Burns is part of the traditional lands of the Wiljali people.

The town was laid out as a grid of five by six streets, but due to the location and environment never developed beyond a village.

References

Towns in New South Wales
Far West (New South Wales)